Shawn Draper (born April 5, 1979 in Huntsville, Alabama) is a former American football tight end and offensive lineman of the National Football League. He was drafted by the Miami Dolphins in the fifth round of the 2001 NFL Draft. He played college football at Alabama. He played high school football at S. R. Butler High School in Huntsville. 

Draper was also a member of the Minnesota Vikings, Carolina Panthers, Philadelphia Eagles, New Orleans Saints and Atlanta Falcons.

References

1979 births
Living people
Sportspeople from Huntsville, Alabama
American football tight ends
American football offensive guards
American football offensive tackles
Alabama Crimson Tide football players
Miami Dolphins players
Minnesota Vikings players
Carolina Panthers players
Philadelphia Eagles players
New Orleans Saints players
Atlanta Falcons players
Rhein Fire players